The Embassy of the United Republic of Tanzania in Beijing has the role to promote relations and co-operation between the United Republic of Tanzania government and the Peoples Republic of China government. The Embassy is also authorized to the Socialist Republic of Vietnam, the Democratic People's Republic of Korea and the Mongolian People's Republic.

References

Tanzania
Beijing
China–Tanzania relations